Antoine Louis John Ruchonnet (28 April 1834, in Lausanne – 14 September 1893, in Bern) was a -century Swiss attorney and politician. In 1864, he founded the Vaud Credit Union.

Public service 
He was first elected to public service as a deputy to the Grand Council of Vaud in 1863, then twice to the Lausanne Communal Council (1866–68, 1878–81). On 10 December 1875 he was elected to the Swiss Federal Council for the canton of Vaud but declined to serve. He was elected again as Federal Counsellor on 3 March 1881 and this time accepted the position and died still in office on 14 September 1893. He served twice as President of the Confederation, first in 1883 and again in 1890. He was a unifying figure, along with his successor as Federal Counsellor for Vaud, Eugène Ruffy, in the Free Democratic Party of Switzerland.

During his time in office he was responsible for the following federal administrative departments:
 Trade and Agriculture (since renamed Economic Affairs, Education and Research) - 1881
 Foreign Affairs - 1883
 Justice and Police - 1882, 1884–93

Freemasonry 
Ruchonnet was elected to serve as the first Master of Liberty Masonic Lodge in Lausanne when it was chartered on 11 September 1871.

Likenesses and namesakes 
Avenue Louis-Ruchonnet in Lausanne is named after him and a bronze statue of him stands in the Old Town of Lausanne, erected in 1906. There is also an 1888 portrait of him by Adolfo Müller-Ury (1862-1947) in the Musee des Beaux-Arts in Lausanne, gifted by his son Ernest in 1894.

References

Further reading

External links 

 
 

1834 births
1893 deaths
People from Lausanne
Swiss Calvinist and Reformed Christians
Free Democratic Party of Switzerland politicians
Foreign ministers of Switzerland
Members of the Federal Council (Switzerland)
Members of the National Council (Switzerland)
Presidents of the National Council (Switzerland)
University of Lausanne alumni